Penelope Allison "Penny" Peyser is an American actress, writer, and filmmaker.

Early life
Peyser was born in Irvington, New York, and attended Irvington High School, where she starred in student musical theatre productions. She is the daughter of Marguerite (née Richards) and Peter A. Peyser, who at the time was mayor of Irvington, and later a five-term United States Congressman in the late 1970s and early 1980s.

Peyser was attracted to acting when, at the age of six, she saw Julie Andrews in My Fair Lady. Peyser performed in high school productions of The Boy Friend and Bye Bye Birdie. She told Bruce Kimmel in an interview that she enjoyed singing and acting throughout grade school:

My triumph was in sixth grade when I decided to insert a musical number in our non-musical production of Oliver Twist. I was playing the Artful Dodger and couldn't resist the opportunity to sing Consider Yourself along with a self-choreographed tap dance. Now that really brought the house down and imagine the director's surprise.High school – I was a theatre geek with a minor in field hockey. Bye Bye Birdie, The Boyfriend, Born Yesterday – wouldn't you have loved to see me in the Judy Holiday role?

Peyser began higher education at Skidmore College, where she majored in theater and performed the lead in Lysistrata ("while still a virgin and knowing not of what I spoke," she told Kimmel), then transferred to Emerson College in Boston. At Emerson, she continued to study drama and acted in Sam Shepard's La Turista, among other plays. After graduating in 1973 with a degree in theater, she made her professional debut by joining a Boston improv group called The Proposition. Peyser told an interviewer, "They'd take suggestions from the audience and turn them into skits. It was the most high-pressured job I ever had and the lowest paying. I figured it couldn't get any worse than that. After that, I went to New York and began my waitressing career."

Peyser did indeed work as a waitress in Manhattan. She also gained experience as "a glorified chorus girl" in Off-Broadway productions such as Diamond Studs, and performed in the original production of Lanford Wilson's The Hot l Baltimore, and well as, more recently, in Ethel Sings - The Unsung Song of Ethel Rosenberg at the Off-Broadway Samuel Beckett Theatre.

Film and television acting

Peyser moved to Hollywood upon landing a minor role in All the President's Men. Robert Redford, who produced and starred in the film, objected to casting a politician's daughter, but she informed Redford that her father was a liberal Republican who had criticized Richard Nixon, and she got the part.

Two months later, she was cast as Ramona Scott in Rich Man, Poor Man Book II. Peyser then replaced Devon Scott in the role of Roberta Franklin for the second season  of The Tony Randall Show, her first regular TV role.
She also appeared in smaller guest roles in numerous TV series, including B. J. and the Bear, Barnaby Jones, The Incredible Hulk, Knight Rider, The A-Team, The Fall Guy, Tour of Duty, Quantum Leap, L.A. Law, MacGyver ,  Criminal Minds, and The Mentalist. Peyser worked with Paul Bartel and Steven Spielberg in a 1986 episode of Amazing Stories, of which she was the star. She co-starred as Tracy Beaumont in the 1979 TV movie The Girls in the Office and also starred as Emma Gayser Bedell in the 1982 TV mini-series The Blue and the Gray.

For two seasons, Peyser appeared in the role of Cindy Fox in the 1984-86 CBS series Crazy Like a Fox.

Her other feature films include The In-Laws and The Frisco Kid.

Peyser continued acting in theater in Los Angeles, in which she portrayed the lead role in A Moment in the Sun, Red Flags and The Twilight of the Golds.

Peyser has written for the Los Angeles Times as well as other publications.

Filmmaking
Peyser co-produced, wrote and directed the documentary Trying to Get Good: The Jazz Odyssey of Jack Sheldon (2008), which features interviews with Clint Eastwood, Billy Crystal, Merv Griffin, Chris Botti, Dave Frishberg, Tierney Sutton and others. The film won jury and audience prizes at the Nashville Film Festival, the Newport Beach Film Festival, the Indianapolis International Film Festival and the Kansas City Filmmakers Jubilee. She also wrote, produced, filmed, and directed the feature documentary Stillpoint: Life Inside a Zen Community (2014) about a community in the hills above Santa Cruz, California of which "Umi", British former radio deejay Tom Lodge, was the master, and Peyser's sister, Caroline, who is suffering from multiple sclerosis and was dubbed "Mouna" by Umi, was one of the members.

Personal life 

Peyser began dating James Carroll Jordan when they were working on Rich Man, Poor Man Book II together. Jordan told an interviewer that they fell in love during their eighth episode together. They were married in 1977, and divorced in 1984. They have a son, James Buckly Jordan, who is Managing Partner of Canyon Creek Capital.

Peyser was married to David Brady from 1991 to 1998; they had a son, Devon P. Brady of Lionsgate Films.

Peyser is currently married to Doug McIntyre, who hosted the radio talk-show McIntyre in the Morning at KABC in Los Angeles.

Filmography

Film

Television

References

External links
 
 Trying to Get Good
Jazz Odyssey of Jack Sheldon

Living people
American television actresses
People from Irvington, New York
Emerson College alumni
American film actresses
20th-century American actresses
21st-century American actresses
Actresses from New York (state)
Year of birth missing (living people)